Azeroth may refer to:

 a fictional world in the 1979 science fiction novel Fires of Azeroth by C. J. Cherryh
 the setting of the Warcraft fantasy video game series

See also
 Azarath, a fictional realm in the DC Comics universe
 Astaroth, a male demon named after the Canaanite goddess Ashtoreth
 Hazeroth, one of the stations where the Israelites stopped during their forty years of wandering in the wilderness